Putilovo is a rural locality (a village) in Vokhtozhskoye Rural Settlement, Gryazovetsky District, Vologda Oblast, Russia. The population was 77 as of 2002.

Geography 
Putilovo is located 73 km east of Gryazovets (the district's administrative centre) by road. Orlovo is the nearest rural locality.

References 

Rural localities in Gryazovetsky District